The mass media in Belarus are mass-media outlets based in Belarus. Television, magazines, and newspapers are operated by state-owned and for-profit corporations and depend on advertising, subscriptions, and other sales-related revenue. The Constitution of Belarus guarantees freedom of speech, but this is contradicted in practice by repressive and restrictive laws. Arbitrary detention, arrests, and harassment of journalists are frequent in Belarus. Anti-extremism legislation targets independent journalism, including material considered unfavourable to the president.

Legislative framework
The legal framework of Belarusian media include the Constitution of Belarus, the Закон Республики Беларусь "О средствах массовой информации" (Media Law of Belarus), international obligations and treaties, and by-laws.

The Media Law of Belarus, enacted in February 2009, required the registration of mass media by February 2010. Some articles of the law are considered to restricting Belarusian citizens' constitutional rights to freedom of speech a free press.

Despite constitutional protections, criticizing the president or the government is a criminal offense in Belarus; libel is punished with fines and imprisonment. No guarantee exists for public access to government records or a free trial. A politicized legal system and obscure regulations are used to harass independent media outlets in Belarus. Since it is not a member of the Council of Europe, Belarus is not bound to the European Convention on Human Rights. More than 20 journalists were questioned, warned or fined in 2014 for "illegal production and distribution of media products". Belarusian journalists adopted two ethical codes in 1995: "Кодекс профессиональной этики журналиста" (Code of Professional Etiquette of the Journalist of the Belarus Union of Journalists) and "Кодекс журналистской этики" (Code of Journalistic Ethics of the Belarus Association of Journalists).

Regulatory authorities
The Ministry of Information of Belarus, established in 2001, is the country's media regulator. Licensing and registration procedures are opaque and politicized. Since 2009, all media outlets (including websites) must register to avoid being blocked. Independent publications have been forced to use foreign-based internet domains. Outlets which "threaten the interests of the state" may be denied accreditation and shut down. In February 2009, the government established a Public Coordination Council for Mass Information to coordinate the interaction of state management, public associations and other organisations generating mass information, enforce mass-media laws, and answer legal questions.

Press accreditation
Journalists need to receive press accreditation by the authorities to be authorized "to cover events organised by state bodies, political parties, other public associations, other legal persons as well as other events taking place in the territory of the Republic of Belarus and outside it" (Art. 1 of the Law on Mass Media). Freelance journalists do not have the right to have accreditation, and journalists working for independent media are often denied accreditation. This means that many public activities are only covered by journalists from state-run media.

Censorship and media freedom

Freedom of the press in Belarus remains restricted. State-owned media are subordinate to the president, and harassment and censorship of independent media are routine. The government intimidates independent and foreign media, especially for reporting on the deteriorating economy and human-rights abuses. Journalists, harassed and detained for reporting on unauthorized demonstrations or working with unregistered media outlets, have died under suspicious circumstances. Most local independent outlets regularly practice self-censorship.

Reporters Without Borders ranked Belarus 154th out of 178 countries in its 2010 Press Freedom Index. In the 2011 Freedom House Freedom of the Press report, Belarus scored 92 on a scale from 10 (most free) to 99 (least free) because Aleksandr Lukashenko's regime curtails press freedom. The score placed Belarus ninth from the bottom of the 196 countries included in the report, giving the country "not free" status.

Outlets
Belarus hosts state- and privately owned media. In 2009 there were 1,314 media outlets in the country, of which 414 were state-owned and 900 privately owned.

The country has a monopoly of terrestrial broadcasting infrastructure, and does not allow cable companies to carry channels without prior approval. State-owned postal and kiosk distribution systems and state-owned print facilities and advertising contracts are often off-limits for independent media. The country's Internet is controlled by Beltelecom. State media are supported with tax cuts and subsidies.
Most state-dominated media in Belarus praise President Alexander Lukashenko and vilify the opposition. Self-censorship is pervasive in private outlets. The Belarusian government maintains a "virtual monopoly" of domestic broadcast media; foreign ownership is restricted to a maximum of 20 percent (30 percent before December 2014). Independent broadcasters from neighboring countries include Belsat TV, Radio Racyia and European Radio for Belarus. Bloggers and online journalism used to be almost free (although limited to a narrow audience), but the government has begun censoring the World Wide Web.

Agencies
Belarus hosts nine news agencies; one or two are state-owned, and seven or eight are privately owned: 
 Belarusian Telegraph Agency (BelTA): Belarus' largest news agency, and the official state news agency for nearly 90 years, it is the most-authoritative source of information on authorities' activities.
 BelaPAN: Private news agency founded in 1991
 : Part of Interfax, it has operated in Belarus since 1994 and caters primarily to national and local media. It established the web portal Interfax.by and the agricultural agency Agrobel.by.
 Ecopress (ЭКОПРЕСС)
 Minsk News (Минск-Новости)
 News Release (Ньюс-Релиз)
 PRIME-TASS (ПРАЙМ-ТАСС)
 Union Info (Союз-инфо)
 Vladimir Grevtsov Agency (Агентство Владимира Гревцова)

Print media

Most print media in Belarus are in the Russian language (572 titles, versus 71 in Belarusian in 2009). The total circulation of national newspapers was 650,000, and 880,000 copies for the state regional press. Eight newspapers were decertified between 1997 and 2009.

Of Belarusian newspapers, the main state-controlled one is Zviazda (Звязда, with a circulation of 40,000). Others include Novy Chas (Новы Час, circulation 7,000)), Nasha Slova (Наша Слова (circulation 7,000, a newspaper about culture and history published by the Frantsishak Skaryna Belarusian Language Society), Naša Niva (Наша Ніва, with a circulation of 6,000 and the oldest Belarusian weekly newspaper, founded in 1906 and revived in 1991) and Holas Radzimy (Голас радзiмы, circulation 2,000), a government-controlled newspaper for the Belarusian diaspora. Regional dailies include the online Vitebsk newspaper Narodnya Naviny Vitsebska (Народныя навіны Віцебска) and Pahonia (Пагоня), a pro-opposition newspaper published in Hrodna and published online since it was closed down by the government in 2001.

Among Russian-language newspapers, the largest national paper is Sovetskaya Belorussia (Советская Белоруссия, circulation over 500,000 and official newspaper of the president of Belarus). Other dailies include Respublika (Рэспубліка; 119,500 copies), official newspaper of the government of Belarus; Vo Slavu Rodiny (Во славу Родины, circulation 32,300), official newspaper of the Belarusian Ministry of Defense; Narodnaya Gazeta (Народная Газета, circulation 25,042), official newspaper of the Parliament of Belarus; BelGazeta (БелГазета, circulation 21,200), independent national newspaper for business and politics, and Belorusy i rynok (Белорусы и Рынок, circulation 12,000), a weekly independent business newspaper. Belorusskaya Delovaya Gazeta (БДГ; BDG), the largest independent newspaper on politics and business during 1990s with a circulation of about 70,000, was closed down in 2006.

Bilingual Russian-Belorusian newspapers include Narodnaja Volia (Народная воля, circulation 15,000), the largest national pro-opposition newspaper on politics;  Hazeta Slonimskaya (Газета Слонімская; Газета Слонимская, circulation 7,000–8,000),), an independent local newspaper published in Slonim; Intex-Press (Интекс-пресс, circulation 17,300), an independent local newspaper published in Baranavichy; Zhodzinskiya Naviny (Жодзінскія Навіны; Zhodino News), published in Zhodzina and Vecherniy Brest (Вечерний Брест; Evening Brest), published in Brest. In 2015, official sources had registered 713 newspapers and 808 magazines.

Publishers
Publishers include the state publisher Belarus, Belarusian Petrus Brouka Encyclopedia, Belarusian Science, Vysheysha shkola (specializing in academic books), Mastatskaya Litaratura, Narodnaya Asveta, Belkartografia, Aversev and the Belsoyuzpechat companies. Four-Quarters, founded in 1992 in Minsk, publishes books on the arts, history and geography. Romm, publisher of the Vilna Talmud, was a Jewish publishing house in Grodno from 1789 to 1941. The independent publisher and bookstore Lohvinau had its license revoked in 2013, was denied registration in 2014 and was fined.

Radio

In February 2009 there were 158 radio stations in Belarus: 137 state-owned and 21 privately owned. Twenty-three stations, including Беларусь (Radio Belarus), Roks (Рокс), Радио Мир (Radio World), Альфа радио (Alpha Radio) and Би-Эй (B-A), have broadcast on FM since the early 1990s.

State-owned broadcaster Belteleradio broadcasts First Channel, Culture, Radius-FM, Radio Stolitsa and Radio Belarus. Local stations include Radio Brest, Radio Vitebsk, Gomel FM, Radio Grodno, and Radio Mogilev

Other state radio stations include Radio Minsk (Government of Minsk), MV Radio (Government of Minsk Region), Radio Unistar (Belarusian State University and MediaInvest), Novoe Radio (Federation of Trade Unions of Belarus), Pilot FM (Belarusian Republican Youth Union), and Radio ONT.

Semi-private radio stations include Radio Europa Plus Belarus, Radio Humor FM (Vashe Televidenie), Dushevnoe Radio and two joint ventures: Narodnoe radio (with Radio BA International and Radio Melodii Veka) and Russian Radio (with Russian Radio Belarus and Roks).

Regional stations include MFM (Grodno, 105.0 FM), Baranavichy FM (100.0), Gomel Plus (Gomel, 101.3), Radio 107.4 FM (Gomel), Retro FM (Vitebsk, 104.6), Polotsk (104.7), Radio Skif (Orsha, 99.9), Hit Radio (Minsk, 100.4), Svoyo Radio (Pinsk, 106.1), Radio Naftan (Polatsk, 98.1) and Nelly–info (Mazyr, 102.7)

Independent radio stations include Radio Svaboda, European Radio for Belarus (FM and Internet), Radio Racyja (FM and Internet) and the Internet radio stations Radio A+, Netradio and several Roks channels.

Radio 101.2 was a Minsk-based independent station which was closed by the government in 1996 and transferred to the Belarusian Republican Youth Union. The independent Autoradio was shut down in 2010.

European Radio for Belarus (Eŭrapéjskaje Rádyjo dla Biełarúsi) is an international radio station based in Warsaw which has provided independent news, information and entertainment to Belarusians since February 2006. ERB operates on both FM bands, Internet and satellite to promote democracy and help develop a new generation of journalists. Members of the Belarusian Association of Journalists (BAJ) and journalists from the former Radio 101.2 participated in the station's creation.

Television

Television is the primary source of information for Belarusians, and the main TV channels are state-controlled. In 2009 there were 71 TV channels broadcasting in Belarus, of which 30 were state-owned and 41 privately owned.

Belteleradio (BTRC) is the state-owned television company. It operates six television channels, five national and one international. Belteleradio broadcasts Belarus-1 (news, current-affairs and general-interest programs), Belarus-2 (entertainment and sports), Belarus-3 (cultural programmes), Belarus-4 (regional news, entertainment and cultural programmes for Brest, Vitebsk, Gomel, Grodno, Minsk and Mogilev), Belarus-5 (sports), Belarus-24 (international satellite channel) and NTV Belarus, the national version of NTV Russia with programmes from NTV Russia and other Russian channels. The company has a staff of about 1,000 employees.

Obshchenatsional'noe Televidenie (National Television, ОНТ or ONT) is Belarus' second national TV station, replacing Channel One Russia since a 2002 presidential decree (although it still broadcasts most of the former's programmes in Russian and Belarusian. It is owned by the Ministry of Information (51 percent), Belarusbank (29 percent) and the Factory of Information Technology" (20 percent). Belsat TV (Белсат TV), an independent channel owned by Telewizja Polska, has been on the air since December 2007. STV (Сталічнае тэлебачаньне) and Belarus RTR (a local version of Russia's RTR Planeta), owned by the Minsk city government, began broadcasting in 2001 and 2008 respectively. MIR, owned by MIR State Broadcasting, began broadcasting in 2003. Skif, owned by Telecom-Garant, is a regional network which has been on the air since 1992. BelMuzTV (a local version of Russia's Muz TV) and TNT-International (a local version of TNT (Russia) and TNT-Comedy), owned by BelMuzTV Redaction, went on the air in 2006 and 2015 respectively. VTV, owned by Dobrovidenie, is an entertainment channel which began broadcasting in 2002. 8 Kanal (8 канал) is an independent general-entertainment channel. Minsk TV (Мінск TV), owned by Cosmos TV, is a documentary channel which began broadcasting in 2015.

Analog TV signals from nearby Poland, Ukraine, Lithuania and Latvia are received in Belarus, and programmes from Russia, Poland, Ukraine and Western Europe are broadcast by cable-TV operators. Three cable television operators offer access in Belarus' main cities to about 100 broadcast channels and IPTV. Satellite channels include Belarus 24, a state non-commercial channel in Belarusian and Russian languages which began broadcasting in 2005, and a music channel introduced in 2002.

Cinema

The golden era of Belarus cinema extended from the 1960s to the 1980s. The state film studio, Belarusfilm (located in Minsk since 1939 and in operation since 1946) is being modernized.

During the Soviet era, Belarusfilms was nicknamed "Partizanfilm" due to its large number of films portraying the Soviet partisans' struggle against Nazi occupation. The studio, also noted for its children's films, has made over 130 animation films (most in Russian). Belarusfilm has produced about 10 feature films and four animated films per year since 1997. It is a co-organiser of the annual November Listapad film festival (Minsk International Film Festival) in Minsk.

Telephones and Internet

Belarus has 3.7 million landline subscribers (800,000 in the countryside) and 8.7 million mobile-phone subscribers. Three companies use the GSM standard (МТС, Velcom and Life:)), and Diallog uses CDMA.

In 2009, 31 percent of the population of Minsk had Internet access; the percentage in other major cities was 12 percent. One hundred eighty ISPs served 3.1 million users (470,000 broadband users). Beltelecom has a monopoly of Internet access.

The largest independent media outlet in Belarus in Nexta, which runs several channels on Telegram, the most popular of which counts over 1.2 million subscribers.

Media ownership and pluralism
Unlike in other post-Soviet states after the breakup of the Soviet Union in the early 1990s, Belarus left in place state control and ownership over most national media. The main radio and television infrastructure of Belarus is governed by the National State TV and Radio Company, which operated during the Soviet times. It consists of five Belarusian thematic television channels (Belarus-1, Belarus-2, Belarus-3, Belarus-5, and Belarus-24) and a licensed version of the Russian channel NTV.  

However, the number of media outlets does not translate into a real pluralism. While in other post-Soviet states the problem is a concentration of private ownership, in Belarus the problem is a near-monopoly of the government.

In 2010 OSCE Representative on Freedom of the Media Dunja Mijatović "said [that] pluralism was non-existing in the broadcasting sector, restricted in the print media and vulnerable on the Internet".

In 2015 UN Special Rapporteur on the situation of human rights in Belarus Miklós Haraszti said: "Media pluralism is absent. Belarus is the only country in Europe with no privately owned nationwide broadcasting outlets".

Online media are freer than traditional ones, and the access to Internet is growing thus giving access to more diverse news sources.

State-owned media
The government owns more than 600 news outlets. Amongst them there is SB-Belarus Segodnya, which belongs to the Presidency. Its circulation "exceeds all independent social and political mass media taken together".

All domestic national television stations are all owned by the state.

The National State Television and Radio Company of the Republic of Belarus is the largest media holding in the country. The state also own -among the other things- the Belarusian Telegraph Agency, the national news agency. On the total of 158 radios existing in 2009, 137 were state-owned.

State-owned media also receives governmental subsidies and benefits and are not pluralistic.

Private-owned media
Private media outlets that are not supported by the state suffers from economic discrimination. Advertisers are advised by the authorities to place ads only in state-owned media or state-friendly media, avoiding critical ones.

Belsayuzdruk, the state-owned distributor, and Belposhta, the national postal service have refused to sell and deliver several independent newspapers, so they have to use only private distributors. Since this represents a serious loss this is strong tool to influence private media.

Few private-owned printed media (around three-quarters of the total number) produce original journalistic content."

Foreign media
Foreigners cannot own more than 20% of a media company. However, the media sector is dominated by Russia-originated news content, because many Russian television channels are re-broadcast. The main Russian television channels are registered in Belarus as local companies. Russian is more used than Belarusian language in everyday life, and in the media sector.

Transparency of media ownership

Unions and organisations

Media professionals in Belarus may join two trade unions: Белорусский союз журналистов (Belarus Union of Journalists, established in 1958 as a professional, independent organization of Belarusian mass-media workers) and the Belarusian Association of Journalists, established in 1995 as an alternative to the existing trade union. The BAJ is a voluntary, non-governmental, non-party association of citizens engaged in a professional journalistic activity or promoting its development. The Union of Press Publishers and Distributors (SIRP) was created in December 2006 as a non-commercial organization of media publishers and distributors. Non-governmental media associations include the Belarus Association of Non-Governmental TV and the Belarus Sports Press Association.

References

Ministry of Information of the Republic of Belarus
 
Belarus
Belarus